Marta Ptaszyńska (born 29 July 1943) is a Polish composer, percussionist and professor of music at the University of Chicago. She has been described by the Polish Music Center of the University of Southern California as "one of the best known Polish woman composers" as well as "a virtuoso percussionist specializing in performances of contemporary music".

Career
Ptaszyńska was born in Warsaw, Poland. In 1998, she was appointed a Professor of Music and the Humanities at the University of Chicago. Since 2005 she holds an endowed chair of Helen B. & Frank L. Sulzberger Professor in Composition.

She has been honored with many prizes and awards including Simon J. Guggenheim Foundation Fellowship, the Danks Award of the American Academy of Arts and Letters, the Fromm Music Foundation Award, the Award at the International Rostrum of Composers at the UNESCO in Paris, several ASCAP Awards, and many more. In 1995, she received the Officer Cross of Merit of the Republic of Poland.

Works

Orchestral music

Vocal and instrumental works

Chamber music

Instrumental and solo works

Multimedia works

Music for children

Books
Ptaszynska, Marta & Niewiadomska, Barbara; Colorful World of Percussion (1978) A book for percussion training in 5 volumes.
 about Ptaszyńska :
Muzyka to język najdoskonalszy. Rozmowy z Martą Ptaszyńską, Kraków/Cracow PWM 2001

See also
 Poles in Chicago

Notes

Further reading
Meckna, Michael, and Barbara Zwolska-Stęszeweska. 2001. "Ptaszyńska, Marta". The New Grove Dictionary of Music and Musicians, second edition, edited by Stanley Sadie and John Tyrrell. London: Macmillan Publishers.

External links
Marta Ptaszynska's page at Theodore Presser Company
 Marta Ptaszyńska on the University of Chicago's website
 Marta Ptaszyńska at the Polish Music Center
 Marta Ptaszyńska at PWM Edition
 Two Interviews with Marta Ptaszyńska, March 4, 1988 & May 25, 1997

Polish classical composers
Living people
1943 births
Women classical composers
20th-century classical composers
21st-century classical composers
Classical percussionists
20th-century women composers
21st-century women composers
Polish women composers